Emilio Alberto Cordero (born 2 February 1994) is a Puerto Rican international footballer who plays college soccer for Pittsburgh Panthers, as a defender.

Career
Cordero has played college soccer for the University of Pittsburgh Panthers men's soccer team.

He made his senior international debut for Puerto Rico in 2012.

References

1994 births
Living people
People from Guaynabo, Puerto Rico
Puerto Rican footballers
Puerto Rico international footballers
Pittsburgh Panthers men's soccer players
Association football defenders